The Fujifilm GFX 50R is a mirrorless medium format camera produced by Fujifilm. It shares its image sensor, processor and most of its components with the larger GFX 50S. The 50R is smaller and less expensive than the 50S but looks like the X-Pro2.

The camera was announced by the corporation on September 25, 2018. The camera has been available for sale since November 2018.

It is a mirrorless medium format camera incorporating a large sensor, 1.7 times the size of a full-size 35mm image sensor.

Unlike the 50S, the 50R only has a smaller electronic viewfinder located on the left of the body. The 50S has a larger viewfinder located in its center. 

The GFX 50R was discontinued in September 2021 upon the announcement of the Fujifilm GFX50S II.

Key Features
51.4MP medium format CMOS sensor (43.8 × 32.9mm) with Bayer filter array
AF-point-selection joystick
Weather-sealed
1/125 sec flash sync speed
3 fps continuous shooting
1080/30p video capture
In-camera Raw processing
Dual SD card slots (UHS-II)
USB C socket
Wi-Fi with Bluetooth

See also 
 Fujifilm GFX 50S
 Fujifilm G-mount

References

External links 

 Fujifilm GFX 50R official site

Fujifilm G-mount cameras
Cameras introduced in 2017